The European Riichi Mahjong Championship (ERMC) is the European competition of Mahjong certified by European Mahjong Association (EMA) under Japanese rules. Both men and women are eligible to contest this title. It was established in 2008 and has since then taken place on two yearly basis.

The name was "European Riichi Championship" (ERC) until 2013.

Champions

Individual

Team

Venues

See also
European Mahjong Association (EMA)
Open European Mahjong Championship (Another European Championship held by EMA)

References

External links
European Riichi Championship 2010 Official Site
EMA Official Riichi Rule

European mahjong championships